Amaya is a Japanese surname and a Spanish surname. Notable people with the surname include:

People with Japanese-language surname

 Naohiro Amaya (1925–1994), Japanese politician
 Daisuke Amaya (1977-), Japanese software developer
 Sohichiro Amaya (1983-), Japanese baseball player

People with Spanish-language surname

 Andrés Amaya  (c.1645-1704), Spanish Baroque painter.
 Manuel de Amaya (c.1740-c.1800), Spanish merchant and politician.
 Lorenzo Amaya (1896-1969), Argentine sports shooter.
 Carmen Amaya (1913/1914-1963), Spanish Romani flamenco dancer and singer.
 Ramón Amaya Amador (1916-1966), Honduran journalist, author, and political activist.
 Mario Amaya (1933-1986), American art critic, museum director and magazine editor, and director.
 Dionisia Amaya (1933-2004), was a teacher and Honduran Garifuna community activist.
 Jorge Amaya (1934-), Argentine equestrian.
 Angel Amaya (1934-), Venezuelan boxer.
 Mario Abel Amaya (1935-1976), Argentine lawyer and politician and reformist activist.
 Rufina Amaya (1943-2007), Salvadoran survivor.
 Roberto Amaya (1944-), Argentine boxer.
 George Amaya (1950-2005), American professional tennis player of Colombian descent
 María Elvia Amaya Araujo (1954-2012), Mexican psychologist, philanthropist, and politician.
 Victor Amaya (1954-), American retired tennis player.
 Efraín Amaya (1959-), Venezuelan-born American composer.
 Remedios Amaya (1962-), Spanish flamenco singer.
 Jesús Amaya (1969-), Colombian professional golfer.
 Ashraf Amaya (1971-), retired American professional basketball player. 
 Alexander Amaya (1975-), Salvadoran professional footballer. 
 Alejandro Amaya (1977-), Mexican matador.
 Rafael Amaya (1977-), Mexican actor.
 Iván Amaya (1978-), Spanish retired footballer.
 Dolores Amaya (1980-), Argentine rower.
 José Amaya (1980-), Colombian footballer.
 Antonio Amaya (1983-), Spanish professional footballer.
 Zuleima Amaya (1985-), Venezuelan marathon runner.
 Waleska Amaya (1986-), Honduran footballer.
 Cristina Amaya (1988-),Colombian racquetball player.
 Jonathon Amaya (1988-), former American football safety.
 Adonis Amaya (1996-), American soccer player.
 Luis Amaya (1997-), Mexican footballer.
 Frankie Amaya (2000-), American professional soccer player.
 Andrea Amaya (2003-), Salvadoran footballer.

Japanese-language surnames
Spanish-language surnames